Patrick "Padge" McWalter (born 6 January 1984), is a retired footballer who played with League of Ireland side UCD. In his spell at UCD his versatility has been put to use seeing him deployed in a number of positions at left wing, right wing and up front. Though not prolific in his role as striker Pat finished as UCD's top scorer in the league in 2005. He also had the misfortune of scoring an own goal in UCD's League Cup final defeat to Derry City that year. McWalter picked up a serious cruciate knee ligament injury at the end of the 2006 season and spent most of the 2007 season recovering. He managed to stage a comeback a few months before the season's end and began the 2008 season as UCD's first choice left winger.

McWalter left UCD at the end of the 2008 season to concentrate solely on playing Gaelic football for the Wicklow county team.
He taught in Blackrock College for the year of 08/09. He taught History and Geography and left the school after 1 year. He currently teaches in Avondale Community College in Rathdrum.

Career statistics

GAA career
McWalter played an instrumental role in his club St Patrick's run to the county football final of 2008. Lining out at centre back in the final, his team were defeated but McWalter picked up the man of the match accolade. As a result of these performances, he was called up to the senior panel for 2009.
His impact was immediate and he played a starring role in Wicklow's championship run to the last 12 of the All-Ireland series. His form continued into 2010 and while he was having a great game against Carlow in a Leinster Championship game. He suffered a serious injury to his kneecap which will see him out of action for some time.

References

1983 births
Living people
Association football wingers
Republic of Ireland association footballers
University College Dublin A.F.C. players
League of Ireland players
Gaelic footballers who switched code
Geography teachers
Irish schoolteachers
St Patrick's (Wicklow) Gaelic footballers
Wicklow inter-county Gaelic footballers